Paris Is Burning may refer to:

Paris Is Burning (film), a 1990 documentary film
"Paris Is Burning" (Gilmore Girls), the eleventh episode of Gilmore Girls''' first season
 "Paris Is Burning", a song from the 1983 album Breaking the Chains'' by Dokken
Paris Is Burning (EP), an extended play by musician Annie Clark
"Paris Is Burning" (song), a 2008 single by Ladyhawke

See also
 Is Paris Burning? (disambiguation)